Gazund (also Romanized as Gazūnd and Gozūnd; also known as Gazand, Garvand, Gazūn, Gazvand, and Kozūn) is a village in Tabas-e Masina Rural District, Gazik District, Darmian County, South Khorasan Province, Iran. At the 2006 census, its population was 153, in 31 families.

References 

Populated places in Darmian County